The Autoroute 3, abbreviated to A3 or otherwise known as the Dudelange motorway, is a motorway in southern Luxembourg. At Dudelange, it reaches the French border, whereupon it meets the A31, which leads to Metz.

Overview
The A3 was opened in three separate sections:
 1978: Croix de Gasperich - Dudelange
 1981: Dudelange - French Autoroute 31
 21 June 1995: Hesperange - Croix de Gasperich

The motorway has two lanes in both directions for its entire length, with the exception of a 1.3 km section on the northbound carriageway, where there are three lanes between the Livange/Bettembourg entry slip road (J2) and the Berchem service station entry slip road, where it again merges to become two lanes.

Route

References

External links

  Administration des Ponts et Chaussées

Motorways in Luxembourg